John Muir Award may refer to:
 Sierra Club John Muir Award
 John Muir Award, a film award of the National Educational Film Festival, won in 1977 by Dan Gibson
 John Muir Lifetime Achievement Award, an award of the John Muir Trust